Kate Bliss (born 1975) is an English antiques expert and television presenter.

She has appeared on the BBC's Bargain Hunt, Flog It! and Secret Dealers, and has presented Put Your Money Where Your Mouth Is. Bliss specialises in jewellery and silver, and is a fellow of the Great Britain Gemmological Association.

Early life
Bliss was born Kate Alcock in 1975 in Herefordshire, she grew up in Hampton Bishop and later Dorstone. Educated at Hereford Cathedral School, she then read English Literature at Brasenose College, University of Oxford before studying fine art.

Career
A member of the Royal Institution of Chartered Surveyors, having previously worked for her father's valuation and auction business, she joined Brightwells Auctioneers and Valuers. She then joined Philip Serrell's auction business. In light of her growing young family, Bliss currently runs her own Fine Art Valuation business, and works in association with a number of auction houses as a jewellery and silver expert, including Charles Hanson's business.

Bliss made her television debut after being spotted by the crew of Bargain Hunt, when they were on a visit to Brightwells auction house filming an episode. She then became an antiques expert on the programme, and later made appearances on Flog It! and Secret Dealers. Bliss has presented Put Your Money Where Your Mouth Is.

Personal life
Married to Jonathan Bliss since 2005, the couple have two children.

Bliss is a talented pianist having performed in her early teenage years at Dorstone parish church Herefordshire - this was reported in the local church magazine July 1989.

Bliss is a supporter of St Michael's Hospice and the Alzheimer's Society, since her grandmother was diagnosed with Alzheimer's.

References

External links 

1975 births
Living people
People from Herefordshire
People educated at Hereford Cathedral School
Alumni of Brasenose College, Oxford
Antiques experts
English television personalities